Thierry Argelier (born 8 July 1986, in Paris) is a French professional football player. Currently, he plays for US Colomiers.

Career
Argelier joined US Colomiers ahead of the 2019/20 season.

Career statistics

References

 Thierry Argelier at foot-national.com
 
 

1986 births
Living people
French footballers
Footballers from Paris
Association football defenders
Ligue 2 players
Championnat National players
US Créteil-Lusitanos players
En Avant Guingamp players
Vannes OC players
Vendée Poiré-sur-Vie Football players
US Boulogne players
US Colomiers Football players